The Carleton Civic Centre is an 836-seat multi-purpose arena in Woodstock, New Brunswick. The arena was built in 1995, and also includes an indoor swimming pool, fitness center, community and board rooms. It was home to the Woodstock Slammers ice hockey team of the Maritime Hockey League. and was known to fans as 'Slammerland".

References

External links
Website of the Town of Woodstock Recreation Department

Buildings and structures in Carleton County, New Brunswick
Indoor arenas in New Brunswick
Indoor ice hockey venues in Canada
Sports venues in New Brunswick
Woodstock, New Brunswick